SMS S17 was a V1-class torpedo boat of the Imperial German Navy. The ship was built by Schichau-Werke, at their Elbing shipyard, completing in 1912. S17 served with the German High Seas Fleet during the First World War, taking part in the Battle of Jutland in 1916. She was sunk by a mine on 16 May 1917.

Construction and design
In 1911, the Imperial German Navy decided to break the pattern of each year's orders of torpedo boats being a development of the previous year's designs, as it felt that they were getting too big to work for the fleet, and instead the 12 torpedo boats (six each ordered from AG Vulcan and Germaniawerft) (the V1-class) were smaller than those ordered in recent years in order to be more manoeuvrable and so work better with the fleet. This change resulted in the numbering series for torpedo boats being restarted. The 1912 programme placed orders for a flotilla of 12 torpedo boats of similar design ( to ) with Schichau-Werke. The reduction in size resulted in the ships' seaworthiness being adversely affected, however, with the 1911 and 1912 torpedo boats acquiring the disparaging nickname "Admiral Lans' cripples".

S17s armament consisted of two  SK L/30 naval guns in single mounts fore and aft, together with four 50 cm (19.7 in) torpedo tubes with one reload torpedo carried. Up to 18 mines could be carried. The ship had a crew of 74 officers and other ranks. In 1916, the guns were replaced by more powerful 8.8 cm SK L/45 naval guns.

S17, yard number 868, was launched at Schichau's shipyard in Elbing, East Prussia (now Elbląg in Poland) on 22 June 1912 and was commissioned on 7 December that year.

Service
In May 1914, S17 was part of the 13th half-flotilla of the 7th Torpedo boat Flotilla.

First World War
S17 remained a member of the 13th half-flotilla of the 7th Flotilla, part of the German High Seas Fleet, at the outbreak of the First World War in August 1914. The 7th Torpedo Boat Flotilla supported the Raid on Yarmouth on 3 November 1914 and the Raid on Scarborough, Hartlepool and Whitby on 16 December 1914. Argo rammed S22 and made off, with the two torpedo boats not opening fire as the commanding officer was unsure whether they were in Swedish territorial waters. Argo was seized at Utlängan in Swedish waters, and taken to the German port of Swinemünde (now Świnoujście in Poland) but was released after a few hours.

S17, as part of the 7th flotilla, was part of the High Seas Fleet when it sailed to cover the Lowestoft Raid on 24–25 April 1916. At the Battle of Jutland on 31 May–1 June 1916, S17 was still part of the 13th Half-flotilla of the 7th Torpedo boat flotilla, operating in support of the main German battle fleet. During the night action, the 7th flotilla was ordered to search for and attack the British fleet, being allocated the sector to the south-east of the German fleet. As the British fleet had a night cruising speed of 17 knots, this would limit the 7th Flotilla's effectiveness. The 7th Flotilla briefly clashed twice with British destroyers during the night, but no ships on either side were damaged in these clashes and S17 did not open fire.

S17 was transferred to coastal defence duties in 1917, and on 16 May 1917 was sunk by a mine in the North Sea, that had been laid by the British submarine  on 12 May. In total eight ships were claimed by this small minefield of 20 mines by the end of June.

Notes

References

Bibliography
 
 
 
 
 

 
 

Torpedo boats of the Imperial German Navy
1912 ships
World War I torpedo boats of Germany
V1-class destroyers